Hadreule is a genus of tree-fungus beetle in the family Ciidae.

Species
 Hadreule blaisdelli (Casey, 1900)
 Hadreule elongatulum (Gyllenhal, 1827)
 Hadreule explanata Lawrence, 1971

References

Ciidae genera